The 68th World Science Fiction Convention (Worldcon), also known as Aussiecon Four, was held on 2–6 September 2010 in the Melbourne Convention and Exhibition Centre in Melbourne, Victoria, Australia.

The co-chairs were Perry Middlemiss and Rose Mitchell.

Participants

Guests of Honour 

 Kim Stanley Robinson (author)
 Robin Johnson (fan)
 Shaun Tan (artist)

Awards

2010 Hugo Awards 

The 2010 Hugo Award statue base was designed by Nick Stathopoulos with laser etching by Lewis Morley and incorporating the Aussiecon 4 logo by Grant Gittus.

 Best Novel: (tie) The City & The City by China Miéville and The Windup Girl by Paolo Bacigalupi
 Best Novella: "Palimpsest" by Charles Stross
 Best Novelette: "The Island" by Peter Watts
 Best Short Story: "Bridesicle" by Will McIntosh
 Best Related Book: This is Me, Jack Vance! by Jack Vance
 Best Graphic Story: Girl Genius, Volume 9: Agatha Heterodyne and the Heirs of the Storm, written by Kaja and Phil Foglio, art by Phil Foglio, colours by Cheyenne Wright
 Best Dramatic Presentation, Long Form: Moon, screenplay by Nathan Parker; story by Duncan Jones; directed by Duncan Jones (Liberty Films)
 Best Dramatic Presentation, Short Form: Doctor Who "The Waters of Mars", written by Russell T Davies & Phil Ford; directed by Graeme Harper (BBC Wales)
 Best Professional Editor, Long Form: Patrick Nielsen Hayden
 Best Professional Editor, Short Form: Ellen Datlow
 Best Professional Artist: Shaun Tan
 Best Semiprozine: Clarkesworld, edited by Neil Clarke, Sean Wallace, and Cheryl Morgan
 Best Fan Writer: Frederik Pohl
 Best Fanzine: StarShipSofa, edited by Tony C. Smith
 Best Fan Artist: Brad W. Foster

Other awards 

 John W. Campbell Award for Best New Writer: Seanan McGuire
 Aussiecon Four Make Ready Short Story Competition Award: Helen Stubbs

Site selection 

The location was selected by the members of Denvention 3.

Future site selection 

The members of Aussiecon 4 selected Chicago, Illinois, as the host city for the 70th World Science Fiction Convention, Chicon 7, to be held in 2012 in an uncontested election. With only 526 ballots cast, this election had the lowest turnout since records began to be kept in 1974. The voting breakdown was 447 votes for Chicago, 20 ballots expressed no preference, and there were 59 write-in votes for various sites.

See also 

 Hugo Award
 Science fiction
 Speculative fiction
 World Science Fiction Society
 Worldcon

References

Further reading

External links 

 Aussiecon Four site
 Aussiecon LiveJournal
 Worldcon official website

2010 conferences
2010 in Australia
2010s in Melbourne
21st-century Australian literature
Science fiction conventions in Australia
Worldcon